Andrea Lawes (born October 11, 1962) is a Canadian curler from Whitby, Ontario.

Awards
STOH All-Star Team: 
Ford Hot Shots: 
Whitby Sports Hall of Fame: 2010

Teams and events

Women's

Mixed

Private life
Her half sister is Kaitlyn Lawes, Olympic and World curling champion. Lawes attended Oak Park Public School in London, Ontario, Collingwood Senior Public School in Collingwood, Ontario, Henry Street High School in Whitby, Ontario and also Seneca College. She works for Ontario Power Generation in Pickering, Ontario. She moved to Whitby with her family in 1976.

References

External links
 
 Andrea Lawes – Curling Canada Stats Archive
 

Living people
1962 births
Curlers from Toronto
Canadian women curlers
Canadian women's curling champions
Continental Cup of Curling participants
Seneca College alumni
Sportspeople from Whitby, Ontario
Canada Cup (curling) participants
20th-century Canadian women